The wildlife of Maldives includes the flora and fauna of the islands, reefs, and the surrounding ocean.

Recent scientific studies suggest that the faunistic composition can vary greatly between atolls following a north–south gradient, but important differences between neighbour atolls were also found (especially in terms of benthic fauna), which may be linked to differences in terms of fishing pressure - including poaching.

Vertebrates

Fish

There is a wide diversity of sealife in the Maldives archipelago, with corals and over 2,000 species of fish, ranging from colorful reef fish to the Blacktip reef shark, moray eels, and a wide variety of rays: manta ray, stingray, and eagle ray. The Maldivian waters are also home for the whale shark. The waters around the Maldives are abundant in rare species of biological and commercial value, with tuna fisheries being traditionally one of the main commercial resources of the country, with shells.
In the few ponds and marshes there are freshwater fish, like Chanos chanos and other smaller species. The tilapia or mouth-breeder was introduced by a UN agency in the 1970s.

Reptiles and amphibians
Since the islands are very small, land-based reptiles are rare. There is a species of gecko, as well as one species of agamid lizard, Calotes versicolor, the skink Riopa albopunctata, the wolf snake Lycodon aulicus and a small harmless blind snake Ramphotyphlops braminus.

In the sea there are turtles, like the green turtle, the hawksbill turtle and the leatherback turtle, that lay eggs on Maldivian beaches. Pelagic sea snakes (Hydrophis platurus) that live in the Indian Ocean are occasionally cast up onto the shore after storms, where they are rendered helpless and unable to return to the sea. Saltwater crocodiles have also been known to reach the islands and dwell in marshy areas.

The short-headed Sphaerotheca rolandae frog is found in a few islands, while the toad Bufo melanostictus has a more widespread presence.

Birds

The oceanic location of this Indian Ocean archipelago means that its avifauna is mainly restricted to pelagic birds. Most of the species are characteristic of Eurasian migratory birds, only a few being typically associated with the Indian sub-continent. Some of them are seasonal, like the frigatebirds. There are also birds that dwell in marshes and island bush, like the grey heron and the moorhen. White terns are found occasionally on the southern islands due to their rich habitats.

Mammals
There are very few land mammals in the Maldives. Only the flying fox and a species of shrew could be said to be endemic. Cats, rats, and mice have been introduced by humans, often invading the uninhabited areas of islands and becoming pests. It is strictly forbidden to bring dogs to the Maldives.
In the ocean surrounding the islands there are several species of whales and dolphins. Occasionally stray seals from Subantarctic waters have been recorded to reach the islands.

Invertebrates
The islands of the Maldives themselves have been built by the massive growth of coral, a group of living beings.

Coelenterata
There are many kinds of anemones and jellyfish in the Maldivian waters.

Arthropods

There are four species of lobsters and many different species of crabs in the Maldives. Some crabs live in the water, but many live on the beach burrowing holes in the sand by the waterline, like the ghost crab. Fiddler crabs are common on muddy reef shelves.

Certain crab species of the islands are adapted to a purely terrestrial environment. Hermit crabs live under the leaves of shore bushes. There is a type of land crab that can be a domestic pest, living in holes in the houses.
Some species of prawns and shrimp live in the islands but they are not fished with commercial purposes.

There is a kind of centipede, as well as millipedes, a small type of scorpion, and certain species of spiders.

Several species of spiders are found in Maldives. Spiders exhibit remarkable affinity with those found in the southwestern coast of Indian mainland and Sri Lanka. A pioneering work on spiders of Maldives was conducted by R. I. Pocock in 1904 in the work Fauna and Geography of Maldives. A few common spiders include the brown huntsman spider (Heteropoda venatoria), Plexippus paykulli, Argiope anasuja, and lynx spiders, and black widows are very occasionally seen on Hulhumalé island and Malé International Airport.

Mollusks
Octopuses, squid, and clams are common on Maldivian reefs. The giant clam, Tridacna gigas, is common on the reef shelf.

Echinoderms
The Maldive reefs teem with starfish, brittle stars, and sea urchins. Sea cucumbers are now a source of income, being exported to east Asian markets. However, they were not traditionally a form of local fishery. Recent studies show that sea cucumbers are subject to massive overfishing in Maldives, most of it being probably illegal poaching.

Plants

The Maldives have a rich variety of plant life, despite the lack of fertile soils. Three plant communities exist in the Maldives. The first is the foreshore, which is closest to the ocean and mostly bare except for hardy creeping vines such as Ipomoea spp. The next is the beach crest, which is slightly more protected from the tides. Scaevola taccada, Pemphis acidula, Tournefortia argentea, and Guettarda speciosa are very common and often dominant in the plant communities. Finally, the inner island habitats are the most protected. Sometimes dense coconut plantations and moist soils offer extra allow the growth of understory trees, like Morinda citrifolia or Guettarda speciosa. On northern islands, Hibiscus tiliaceus or Premna serratifolia form pure stands. Mixed forests are also common. Out of the vascular plants of the Maldives, 260 grow in the wild and are either native or naturalized, while an additional 323 are cultivated.

Mangrove forests
Mangroves are found in brackish or muddy areas of the Maldives. Fourteen species over ten genera are native to the Maldives, including one fern, Acrostichum aureum.

Ecology
The land-based biotopes of the Maldives are highly endangered. The little land available in the country is being swiftly developed. Formerly uninhabited islands were only occasionally visited, but now almost no untouched uninhabited islands remain. Many of the natural habitats of local species have been severely threatened or destroyed during the past decades of development.

Coral reef habitats have also been damaged, as the pressure for land has brought about the creation of artificial islands. Some reefs have been filled with rubble with little regard for the changes in the currents on the reef shelf and how the new pattern would affect coral growth and its related life forms on the reef edges.

Gallery 
Maldivian sealife

Flora

Birds

See also
List of mammals of the Maldives
List of birds of the Maldives
Marine wildlife of Baa Atoll
Wildlife of India
Wildlife of Pakistan
Wildlife of Sri Lanka
Wildlife of the Indian Subcontinent

Bibliography 
Agassiz, A., The Coral Reefs of the Maldives. 2 vols. Cambridge, Mus. Camp. Zool.: Mem., 1903. 4to. XXV, 168p., 6 p., 8 folded maps, 3 profiles and 71 photographic plates.
Prof. Agassiz' Expedition to the Maldives. The Geographical Journal, 1902.

External links
 “Online Photo Galleries” on Nature and Wildlife of India at "India Nature Watch (INW)" - spreading the love of nature and wildlife in India through photography

References

Maldives
Biota of the Maldives
Biota of archipelagoes